Kürd (also, Kurd) is a village and municipality in the Qabala District of Azerbaijan. It has a population of 1,335.

References 

Populated places in Qabala District